Owl was a short-lived user-generated content site created by AOL in 2010. It was promoted as a "living, breathing library where useful knowledge, opinions and images are posted from experts the world over". At least some of the content was by paid contributors.

, the website's URL links to a Yahoo! holding page.

References 

AOL
User-generated content
Websites
2010 establishments in the United States